The Senster
was a work of robotic art created by Edward Ihnatowicz.
 It was commissioned by Philips to be exhibited in the Evoluon, in Eindhoven, the Netherlands and was on display from 1970 to 1974, when it was dismantled.

It was the first work of robotic sculpture to be controlled by a digital computer.
It was about 8 feet (2.5m) high "at the shoulder" and about 15 feet (4 m) long, constructed of welded steel tubing and actuated by hydraulic rams. There were four microphones and two Doppler radar sensors mounted on its "head", which were used to sense the sound and movement of the people around it.  A computer system (Philips P9201 - a clone of the more common Honeywell 416) controlled the robot and implemented a behavioural system so that the Senster was attracted to sound and low level movement, but repelled by loud sounds and violent movements.  The complicated acoustics of the hall and the completely unpredictable behaviour of the public made the Senster's movements seem a lot more sophisticated than the software would suggest.

After it was decommissioned, the steel structure was on display outside the firm that originally had built it on Colijnsplaat (the Netherlands). In 2017 the frame was purchased by the AGH University of Science and Technology in Krakow. After a lengthy restoration the Senster was reactivated as part of the 100th inauguration of the Academic Year.

References

External links 
 Detailed information about the Senster and Edward Ihnatowicz's other works at www.senster.com

Culture in Eindhoven
History of Eindhoven
Robotic art
1970s robots
Robots of the Netherlands
Individual robots